Polsky may refer to:

 Dave Polsky, American film and television screenwriter
 Donald Perry Polsky (born 1928), American architect
 Gabe Polsky (born 1979), American film director, writer, and producer
 Polsky Films, a film production company based in Los Angeles, California, founded by Gabe Polsky and his brother Alan Polsky
 Gregg Polsky, American professor
 Ruth Polsky (1954-1986), booker and music promoter in New York City

See also
 Yuryev-Polsky (disambiguation), several places in Russia